Dr. Brinks & Dr. Brinks is a 2017 American comedy-drama film directed by Josh Crockett, starring Scott Rodgers, Kristin Slaysman, Ashley Spillers and Robert Longstreet.

Cast
 Scott Rodgers as Marcus Brinks
 Kristin Slaysman as Michelle Brinks
 Ashley Spillers as Alex Brinks
 Robert Longstreet as Bill Tully
 Aalok Mehta as Reggie
 Craig Ng as Barry Joyce
 Anna Rose Hopkins as Connie
 Kate Freund as Pamela
 Donald Ian Black as Don
 DeMorge Brown as Mikey

Release
The film was released in theatres in the United States on 17 August 2018.

Reception
Chris Salce of Film Threat gave the film a score of 8/10 and wrote that it has a "very good" cast that "really fit together", as well as "pretty well-done cinematography, an interesting plot and a pretty decent script."

Gary M. Kramer of Salon.com wrote that the film "yields moments that are enjoyable and meaningful as the adept cast members play up their characters' foibles and insecurities", and that it "lands as a mostly successful tragicomedy."

Gary Goldstein of the Los Angeles Times called the film "uninvolving" and "ill-conceived" and wrote that it "plays more like a tedious, ad-hoc collection of indie-ironic scenes and moments than as any kind of fully baked narrative."

Frank Scheck of The Hollywood Reporter wrote that the film is "so understated in both its dramatic and comedic aspects that it fails to make any real impression whatsoever", but praised Slaysman's performance.

References

External links
 
 

American comedy-drama films
2018 comedy-drama films